Acrocercops auricilla is a moth of the family Gracillariidae, known from West Bengal, India. The hostplant for the species is Swietenia mahagoni.

References

auricilla
Moths of Asia
Moths described in 1859